Nine Television is the television arm of Nine Entertainment.

Channels 
 Nine Network, an Australian commercial free-to-air television primary channel

 9HD is an Australian free-to-air HD digital television multichannel using the primary channel simulcast
 9Gem is an Australian free-to-air digital television multichannel suitable for sport and entertainment
 9Go! is an Australian free-to-air digital television multichannel aimed at 14- to 39-year-olds.
 9Life is an Australian free-to-air digital television multichannel featuring reality and lifestyle programs
 9Rush is an Australian free-to-air digital television multichannel aimed at a 25- to 54-year-old male audience. (joint venture with Warner Bros. Discovery)
 10 Darwin (50% joint venture with Southern Cross Austereo, Network 10 affiliate)
 9Now a video on demand, catch-up TV service which carries the main and multichannels of the Nine Network

Production
Nine Films and Television is the in-house film and television production arm of the Nine Network. In the United States, it is known as the co-producer (with Discovery Kids) of Hi-5 USA.

It produces content primarily for the network and its affiliates NBN and WIN, but also produces feature films for release in cinemas.
Nine Films and Television has produced a few television programs for the network, including:

McLeod's Daughters
Water Rats
Getaway
Hi-5
Cushion Kids
New MacDonald's Farm
Farscape
TV Week Logie Awards

References

Television production companies of Australia
Nine Network